Vinitha Koshy is an Indian actress who made her debut with the 2016 film Aanandam. She won the Kerala State Film Award – Special Jury Award for her performance in Ottamuri Velicham (2017). She has also appeared in the films Aby (2017) and Luca (2019).

Early life
Vinitha Koshy was born in Kallada, Kollam, Kerala. She worked at Father Muller college of nursing mangalore and later as a pediatric counsellor at Mount Elizabeth Medical Centre, Singapore from 2014 to 2016.

Filmography

Film

Music videos

References

External links

Actresses in Malayalam cinema
Actresses from Kollam
Living people
Year of birth missing (living people)